Lazzaro Mongiardini was an 18th-century Italian mathematician.

Works 
 

18th-century births
18th-century Italian mathematicians